José Luis Marello (born September 8, 1965) is an Argentine sprint canoer. He competed in the late 1980s and early 1990s.

At the 1988 Summer Olympics in Seoul, Marello was eliminated in the repechages of both the K-2 500 m and K-4 1000 m events. Four years later in Barcelona, he was eliminated in the semifinals of the K-4 1000 m event.

References
Sports-reference.com profile

1965 births
Argentine male canoeists
Canoeists at the 1988 Summer Olympics
Canoeists at the 1992 Summer Olympics
Living people
Olympic canoeists of Argentina